North London Collegiate School (NLCS) is a private day school for girls in England. Founded in Camden Town, it is now located in Edgware, in the London Borough of Harrow. Associate schools are located in South Korea,  Jeju Island, Dubai and Singapore; all are coeducational day and boarding schools offering the British curriculum. It is a member of the Girls' Schools Association.

Location

North London Collegiate School is located at the western edge of Edgware near the Canons Park. It is accessed by car through Canons Drive from Edgware's High Street. However both Stanmore tube station and Canons Park tube station are walking distance.

History
The North London Collegiate School was founded by Frances Buss, a pioneer in girls' education. It is generally recognised as the first girls' school in the United Kingdom to offer girls the same educational opportunities as boys, and Miss Buss was the first person to use the term 'Headmistress'.

The small school opened in 1850 at No.46 (later renumbered No.12) Camden Street, London. 
Buss believed in the importance of home life and it remained a day school. In 1929, the school bought Canons, a modest villa built by William Hallett Esq, on the site of a palatial residence originally built in the early 18th century by the Duke of Chandos, and relocated to the property (designed by Sir Albert Richardson) in 1940.

Lucinda Elizabeth Shaw, mother to George Bernard Shaw was a director of music at the school, followed in 1908 by Lilian Manson, J.B. Manson's wife. Her ambitious revival of Purcell's Dido and Aeneas in 1910 gained coverage in The Times.

The school introduced a house system in 2014, with the houses being named after noted past pupils. The houses have colours, and each house has two house captains amongst the pupils (a year 9 and a year 11), and a staff head of house.

Today the school caters to girls from ages 4 to 18. It comprises a Junior School (Reception to Year 6) and Senior School (Year 7–13). Former pupils are known as ONLs, short for Old North Londoners. The uniform of North London Collegiate School is light blue and dark brown in colour, however uniform is not compulsory in sixth form.

The co-ed boarding North London Collegiate School Jeju opened in Seogwipo, South Korea in 2011. The school opened another international school in Singapore in August 2020.

Curriculum
North London Collegiate is one of the most academically successful schools in England, having been placed in the top two in the Daily Telegraph exam league tables every year for over a decade. It has been an International Baccalaureate World School since October 2003 . Girls may choose to take the traditional A Levels or the Pre-U or the IB curriculum.

The girls are also encouraged to participate in non-academic pursuits. The Duke of Edinburgh Award scheme is available similarly to all independent schools. They may also take part in activities such as World Challenge Expeditions, Young Enterprise, Model United Nations and various community service projects.

Alleged malpractice in deciding teacher-assessed grades
In December 2022 the Guardian revealed that the school had been the subject of an investigation by an A-level examination board into the teacher-assessed grades given to pupils in 2021. These replaced the formal exams that were cancelled due to Covid. In 2021 90% of its A-level entries got A* grades - the highest in the country - whereas in 2019 the figure was only 34%. The investigation, which has concluded, found that there had been no centre malpractice by the school. North London Collegiate School was not the only private school under investigation. In 2021, the percentage of A* grades from English private schools was 39.5%, but only 16.1% in 2019. Dr Jo Saxton, Ofqual’s chief regulator, confirmed in October 2022 that private schools were being investigated when she appeared before the education select committee.

Headmistresses

Frances Mary Buss (1850 – December 1894)
Sophie Bryant (1895–1918)
Isabella Drummond (1918–1940, previously Head of Camden School)
Eileen Harold (1941–1944)
Dame Kitty Anderson DBE (1945–1965)
Madeline McLauchlan (1965 – December 1985, previously at Henrietta Barnett School)
Joan Clanchy (1986–1997) previously Head of St George's School, Edinburgh
Bernice McCabe OBE (1997–2017, previously at Chelmsford County High School)
Sarah Clark (2018–2022, previously at Queen's School, Chester)

Notable former pupils

Notable former staff
Edith Aitken (founding head of Pretoria High School for Girls)
Peggy Angus (artist, tile and wallpaper designer), teacher 1947-70
 Edward Aveling, teacher of elementary physics and botany (1872-1876)

Bibliography

 The North London Collegiate School 1850–1950: A Hundred Years of Girls' Education Includes 'Essays in honour of the Frances Mary Buss Foundation' together with an appendix section that includes Royal Patrons, The School Prospectus, Prize Day List, Links to Girton College and the University of London, and regulations concerning Prefects and Monitors. Published by OUP (Oxford University Press) in 1950 with 231 pages, including the index. (No author or Editor)
"And Their Works Do Follow Them" by Watson, Nigel London, James & James, 2000

References

External links

Profile on The Good Schools Guide
ISI Inspection Reports
Profile on MyDaughter
NLCS International Ltd.

Private girls' schools in London
Private schools in the London Borough of Harrow
Educational institutions established in 1850
International Baccalaureate schools in England
Member schools of the Girls' Schools Association
1850 establishments in England
Edgware